Alternative fashion or Alt fashion is fashion that stands apart from mainstream commercial fashion. Alternative fashion includes the fashions of specific subcultures such as emo, scene, goth subculture, hip hop,  cyberpunk, kawaii, cottagecore, goblincore, 70's core, and Lolita fashion; however, it is not limited to these. In general, alternative, or 'alt', fashion does not conform to widely popular style trends of the times that have widespread popularity. It may exhibit itself as a fringe style – extremely attention-grabbing and more artistic than practical – but it can also develop from anti-fashion sentiments that focus on simplistic utilitarian drives (e.g.: grunge fashion, which was largely based around comfort and availability).

Historical and sociological perspectives

Alternative fashion is often considered a modern concept but it, and the concept of subculture it is often related to, have existed for centuries. As covered in Ken Gelder's exploration of the history of alternative culture patterns in Western society, "Subcultures: Cultural Histories and Social Practice," alternative fashions have often been used to identify, and even stereotype, members of groups with value systems that diverged from common culture. Gelder states that alternative fashions have traditionally been related to subcultures that have been identified by mass society as:

disinterested in common moral order: idle, parasitical, hedonistic, criminal
disinterested in or against adhering to structure of social class
identification with an area (street, neighborhood, club) rather than self-owned   property
preferring to develop "family" and community outside of traditional paradigms
attitudes against or wary of mass production, homogeneity, heteronormativity, socially imposed behavior constrictions

Those who utilize alternative fashion may vary greatly in beliefs and not identify with any of these concepts. Often it is the mass social perceptions of the meaning of certain fashions and their relation to a particular niche group that is important in understanding the interaction of alternative fashion with mass culture - a fashion is often more remembered for what it is related to in the popular consciousness than what its wearer's intended it to stand for. Particularly in a sociopolitical sense alternative fashion has often been intentionally adopted by an individual or group to display a break from the beliefs or mores of popular culture and as a form of self-expression that challenged the boundaries of what was considered appropriate, fashionable or practical. The meaning behind a certain style, or said style even having a meaning, is up for debate between individual wearers and those outside the style. Many people who choose to utilize alternative fashion often also identify as a member of the LGBTQ+ community, as they feel it is yet another way for them to assert themselves outside of the gender binary. This is considered a way to break free from the grasp that heteronormativity has on mainstream culture, and create a found family of people who also have attitudes against socially imposed behavior constrictions.

The use of subculture terminology in the 21st century to categorize or interpret dress style is often inaccurate, or at the least does not provide a complete picture of the individual being assessed by their 'look,' due to the constant evolution in the meaning, relevance and cohesion of certain subcultures and even the term 'subculture' itself. Alternative fashion is often looked at through the lens of social politics - it is considered a visual expression of opposition to societal norms, thus heavily associated with the idealism, energy and rebellion of youth culture. However, sociological studies into exploring alternative fashion have found individuals who retained statistically uncommon modes of dress on a permanent post-adolescent basis. Alternative fashion generally lays down a challenge to accepted norms, though the reactions received by wearers of alternative fashion from those who adhere to more conventional stylings can be as diverse as the wearers themselves. It can be a visual language that people employ to communicate with each other  indicating common interests or involvement with similar activities, a challenge to modern conceptions of aesthetic beauty and/or a basic form of self-expression, like painting or writing. It may be none of these things - the wearer may have no conscious intent in the choosing of their style and may find themselves outside the mainstream purely by accident.

Common influences
Modern individual alternative fashion genres, and their wearers, may have homogenized or diverse influences that vary from group to group and person to person but some basic similarities do exist across the scope of alt fashion. Some prominent examples of influences, regardless of genre or label, are:

vintage and retro fashion trends that have fallen out of favor with the general population (e.g.: Pin-up girl, Rockabilly, New Romanticism, Victorian fashion, etc.)which are revived or incorporated by a new generation
dress styles, traditional and modern, from other cultures (such as Japanese street fashion) Such as Harajuku, and Decora
various forms of visual and performance art, including painting,   sculpture, film and television
notable personalities - authors, models, musicians, actors, etc.
personal tastes and aesthetics
personal attitudes towards concepts such as individuality, consumerism, social constructs on behavior, self-expression, and/or disillusionment with what is viewed as "normal" society 
considerations of availability and utilitarianism

Like many other aspects of alternative culture, alt fashion is often heavily influenced by music and the dress style of individual bands or musicians. While the qualities of individuality and open-mindedness are associated with alternative fashion, levels of conformity within subcultures, judgemental behaviors and expressions of feelings of superiority exist within certain alternative fashion communities just as they exist in aspects of mainstream fashion and culture. Pressure to 'fit in,' even just within a small niche community, may influence personal style.

Changes in availability
As alternative fashion can relate to such a diverse selection of styles the  acquisition of clothing, accessories and services (such as hair care) can come from a huge variety of resources, particularly as alternative fashion trends become more accepted and assimilated into mainstream culture. Traditionally alternative clothing, shoes and accessories have been largely procured from independently owned businesses, such as the boutiques found in bohemian and artistic districts of large urban centers. Though still popular, these type of small, specialized retailers have become displaced much like mainstream retail outlets by the Internet. Also, as fashion trends are co-opted by more and more people chain stores, which   may offer a wider variety of product at a lower price and are easier to access in non-urban areas than boutiques, began to soak up a large part of the alternative fashion market. This change in the availability and commodification of alternative fashions has encouraged much broader use of styles in the mainstream once only found in niche groups. Items from thrift & vintage shops, altered and DIY fashions have also long held a place in alternative fashion to the point where the use of mismatched second-hand clothing is considered cliche to alternative and liberal ideologies.

Mainstream attention
Many forms of alternative fashion gain attention, and even notoriety, through their relationship to individuals or groups that are seen as socially undesirable – those involved in behavior considered criminal, deviant or anti-social – even though these types of behaviors may not be common among those involved in alternative fashion. For instance, greasers of the 1950s were associated with street gangs and random acts of juvenile violence, hippies of the 1960s (along with ravers of the 1980–90s) with promiscuity, anti-establishment agendas and, especially, drug use and those sporting hip hop style in the 1980s-now with the selling of drugs and other criminal behavior.  The most headline-grabbing event in recent years related to alternative fashion was the wave of anti-Gothic policies and commentary that flooded through common culture in the wake of the Columbine High School massacre. The crime, perpetrated by two young men dressed in black trench coats who were known to be fans of heavy, dark themed music, was immediately associated with the Gothic subculture in the media despite the teens' lack of any concrete affiliation with the dress or musical style usually given this label. Policies were passed in schools across the country banning dress styles and items associated with the Gothic subculture. Many individuals who dressed in any way related to Gothic style, whether or not they associated with this subculture, were targets of fear, anger and suspicion. The subculture as a whole, though extremely diverse in religious and social beliefs, was pigeonholed by the media as a dangerous influence on children.

Alternative fashion's influence on mainstream fashion
Mainstream culture, particularly retailers and the media, have often looked to alternative fashion for up and coming trends and, increasingly, as an easy way to market products to a niche group that may not be having its tastes supplied elsewhere. Some in the alternative community view this as flattering and as a positive expansion of what is socially acceptable, and easily available, fashion. Others consider the involvement of mainstream institutions in alternative fashion as a desecration of what the concept stands for and feel the mass marketing of previously underground styles, particularly to impressionable youth markets who are more concerned with a look than the meaning behind it, amounts to a non-violent form of cultural genocide. When a previously non-mainstream style becomes popular the core group of a certain alternative niche may be watered down with dozens or even hundreds of individuals who are not genuinely invested in the advancement of alternative culture or its precepts of individuality and present an image of the subculture not at all related to its traditional members' behaviors. For instance, rave culture was heavily associated with ideas of racial, gender and sexual orientation equality and encouraged unity, creativity and individuality amongst its members.
The commodification of rave fashions in chain outlets and internet boutiques coincided with a media frenzy focusing on drug use in the rave community. These factors led to an insurgence of young people interested in emulating rave style, and obtaining the substances associated with it, rather than in promoting the utopian precepts originally associated with raves.

Alternative fashion is expressed, discussed, viewed and proliferated through many of the same channels as mainstream fashion, such as fashion shows, websites, blogs and magazines. The use of these avenues in the alt community traditionally tend to follow similar principles to traditional alt fashion itself - existing outside of mainstream outlets, fueled by personal creativity. It is common for projects related to alternative fashion to be independently run by individuals or small groups and to be offered to the public cheaply or free of charge. However, just as alternative fashion has been commodified by chain stores some level of commercialization may exist within outlets of alternative fashion seeking to exploit certain styles as 'the next big thing' or taking financial advantage of customers with limited options. The sheer volume of literature about alternative and subculture fashion, ranging from serious sociological studies to 'guide books' for the casual reader, display how involved, or at least interested, in alternative fashion a large portion of society is.

Alternative fashion examples
Aristocrat
Artistic Dress
Beatnik
Cottagecore
Cyber fashion
Emo
Fetish fashion
Flapper
Goblincore
Goth fashion
Greaser (subculture)
Grunge fashion
Gyaru
Heavy metal fashion
Hip hop
Hippie
Hipster
Japanese street fashion
Lolita fashion
Mobster
Mod
Biker
Pin-up
Punk fashion
Raver
Rivethead
Rockabilly
Rocker (subculture)
Rude boy
Scene (subculture)
Seapunk
Skater fashion
Skinhead
Soft grunge
Steampunk
Surfer

See also 

Hipster
Subculture
List of subcultures
Metal couture
History of the punk subculture
History of modern Western subcultures
Youth subculture

References

Underground culture
1990s fashion
2000s fashion
2010s fashion